John Skladany (born September 24, 1948) is a retired American football coach who most recently served as a defensive coordinator for the North Texas Mean Green football team.  Skladany previously served  as defensive coordinator for the Iowa State Cyclones, Houston Cougars, as well as the UCF Knights.

References

External links
 

1948 births
Living people
Birmingham Americans players
Central Connecticut Blue Devils football players
Colorado State Rams football coaches
Houston Cougars football coaches
Iowa State Cyclones football coaches
Maine Black Bears football coaches
Merchant Marine Mariners football coaches
Northern Arizona Lumberjacks football coaches
Ohio Bobcats football coaches
Ottawa Rough Riders players
UCF Knights football coaches
High school football coaches in Ohio
Sportspeople from Haverhill, Massachusetts